Feitelson is a surname. Notable people with the surname include:

Dina Feitelson (1926–1992), Israeli educator and scholar
 Dina Feitelson Research Award
Lorser Feitelson (1898–1978), American painter 

Jewish surnames